

The Wagait Shire is a local government area in the Northern Territory of Australia. The council was established as the Cox Peninsula Community Government Council on 28 April 1995 and renamed with effect from 1 July 2008. The shire is located west of Darwin, as a 15-minute ferry ride, or a  drive on fully sealed roads.

The council derived its previous name from the Cox Peninsula. It was named after Matthew Dillon Cox who was regarded as the Northern Territory's first pastoralist, who applied for a lease over the peninsula in 1869, just after the establishment of Darwin.  The current name is derived from the name of the township located near Wagait Beach.

Suburbs
 Wagait Beach
 Mandorah

See also

 Local Government Areas of the Northern Territory

References

External links
 LGWORKS:  Cox Peninsula Community Government Council
 NT Land Group

Local government areas of the Northern Territory